David Barry Latchford (born 9 April 1949) is an English former footballer who made 208 appearances in the Football League and 8 in the Scottish League playing as a goalkeeper. He is the older brother of former England international striker Bob Latchford and Celtic goalkeeper Peter Latchford.

Life and career
Latchford was born in Kings Heath, Birmingham. He joined Birmingham City from school in 1964 and signed professional forms once he turned 17. He was called up for the England Youth squad but was not capped; the other goalkeeper in the squad was Peter Shilton. He kept goal for Birmingham in the FA Youth Cup final of 1967, in which they were beaten by Sunderland.

Latchford made his League debut in April 1969 in a 2–1 win at Bury, but with Jim Herriot, Paul Cooper and Mike Kelly also at the club it took another four years for him to establish himself as undisputed first choice. Even then, manager Freddie Goodwin brought in Welsh international Gary Sprake, but Latchford soon regained his first team place, eventually losing it permanently when new manager Willie Bell signed Jimmy Montgomery. Latchford won the club's Player of the Year award in 1973. He left for Motherwell in 1978, followed by spells at Bury, Barnsley, and in non-League football.

After retiring from playing football he became a funeral director, and later became superintendent of cemeteries in Solihull, while coaching for a time at Solihull Borough.

Honours
Birmingham City
 FA Youth Cup runners-up: 1966–67
 Second Division runners-up: 1971–72

References

1949 births
Living people
Footballers from Birmingham, West Midlands
English footballers
Association football goalkeepers
Birmingham City F.C. players
Motherwell F.C. players
Bury F.C. players
Barnsley F.C. players
Redditch United F.C. players
Cheltenham Town F.C. players
English Football League players
Scottish Football League players